Kendall Cedric Gill (born May 25, 1968) is an American former professional basketball player who now works as a television basketball analyst.

Early life

Gill was born in Chicago and attended Rich Central High School in Olympia Fields, Illinois. Graduating in 1986 as a senior, he led Rich Central to a second-place finish in the IHSA class AA state boys basketball tournament. Gill led his team in scoring with 54 points in the four games of the tournament finals, and was named to the six-player All-Tournament team.

After high school, Gill attended the University of Illinois. Playing four years for the Fighting Illini, he was a starter in his last three seasons. As a junior, Gill led the Fighting Illini to the 1989 Final Four before losing to Michigan on a last-second shot. Also among that fabled "Flyin' Illini" squadron were future NBA players Nick Anderson, Marcus Liberty, Kenny Battle and Illini TV/radio broadcaster Stephen Bardo as well as four-year starter Lowell Hamilton. As a senior, Gill led the Big Ten in scoring and was named a first-team All-American (UPI). He left Illinois as the seventh-leading scorer in school history. Gill's Illini earned NCAA bids each year he played. He also won the NCAA Slam Dunk championship in the Final Four his senior season.

Gill was elected to the "Illini Men's Basketball All-Century Team" in 2004.

NBA career
Gill was chosen in the 1990 NBA draft as the fifth overall pick by the Charlotte Hornets, and was named First Team All-Rookie for the 1990–91 season. During this same season, Gill participated in the NBA Slam-Dunk Competition. He had a tough time as a rookie trying to fit into the Hornets rotation, alongside already established back-court teammates Muggsy Bogues and Rex Chapman.

After the 1991 addition of Larry Johnson and departure of Rex Chapman to the Washington Bullets, Gill had a breakthrough year in the 1991–92 season by averaging 20.5 points, 5.1 rebounds and 4.2 assists per game, while shooting 46.7% from the field.

In 1993, Gill helped the Hornets reach the NBA postseason for the first time in franchise history, however, he was traded to the Seattle SuperSonics during the following off-season, along with the Hornets' 1994 first-round pick, for Eddie Johnson, Dana Barros, and the SuperSonics' 1994 first-round pick. The SuperSonics, who also added Detlef Schrempf that same summer, put together a team led by Gary Payton and Shawn Kemp. Unfortunately for Gill and the SuperSonics, even with an all-star caliber team, they suffered two first round eliminations by the Denver Nuggets in 1994 and the Los Angeles Lakers in 1995. Gill would return to Charlotte for the 1995–96 season after being traded there for Hersey Hawkins and David Wingate, but in January 1996, the Hornets dealt Gill and Khalid Reeves to the New Jersey Nets for Kenny Anderson, who became the team's starting point guard while Bogues sat out with a knee injury that only limited him to just six games for the entire season. Gill would suffer an injury that would limit him to only 11 games for the remainder of the season.

For the remainder of the 1990s Gill would play for the Nets, helping the team reach the 1998 playoffs and leading the league in steals in 1998–99. On April 3, 1999, Gill recorded 11 steals in a game against the Miami Heat, tying a single-game record set by Larry Kenon during the 1976–77 season. In this game, he also recorded 15 points and 10 rebounds for a rare points-rebounds-steals triple-double. Gill's final season in New Jersey, the 2000–01 season, was shortened by injury, allowing him to play in only 31 games during the season.

In his final four seasons in the NBA, Gill would play the 2001–02 season with the Miami Heat, the 2002–03 season with the Minnesota Timberwolves, and the 2003–04 season with the Chicago Bulls, before completing his career with the Milwaukee Bucks in 2004.

In his 15 seasons in the NBA, Gill played in 966 games for seven teams. He also appeared in 27 playoff games for four teams. He was a member of the NBA All-Rookie Team in 1991 and went on to compile 12,914 points, 2,945 assists, and 4,002 rebounds during his career.

Personal life
Gill was raised in Matteson, Illinois. He is married to Wendy Gill, and has two boys, Phoenix and Kota.

As a means to maintain his conditioning, Gill took up boxing, eventually entering the professional ranks. Gill had his first bout on June 25, 2005 at the age of 37.

In 1994, Gill made an appearance as himself in a Nickelodeon TV show My Brother and Me. He appeared on the January 23, 2008 edition of Spike TV's Pros vs. Joes.

In 2004 his house was featured on MTV Cribs.

On May 15, 2010, Gill sang a rendition of "Take Me Out to the Ballgame" at Wrigley Field, home of the Chicago Cubs, as they took on the Pittsburgh Pirates.

Gill has provided analysis during pregame and postgame shows on Comcast SportsNet Chicago for Chicago Bulls games. On March 22, 2013, Gill was suspended by Comcast SportsNet for the remainder of the 2012–13 season after a reported physical altercation with analyst Tim Doyle in the Comcast SportsNet newsroom. In September 2013, Gill indicated that he was not returning to the station. However, he was rehired by Comcast SportsNet in late 2015.

In 2017, Gill was signed as a free agent in the BIG3 basketball league by Power to take the place of Corey Maggette after he suffered an injury during the season.

Honors

High school
 1986 – IHSA State Tournament All-Tournament Team
 1992 – Inducted into the Illinois Basketball Coaches Association's Hall of Fame as a player

College
 1989 – Kenny Battle Leadership Award Recipient
 1989 – NCAA All-Regional Team
 1989 – Honorable Mention All-Big Ten
 1989 – Honorable Mention All American
 1990 – Playboy Pre-Season All-American
 1990 – Preseason Wooden Award Nominee
 1990 – Illini Team Co-Captain
 1990 – Illini MVP
 1990 – 1st Team All-Big Ten
 1990 – Consensus 2nd Team All American
 1990 – University of Illinois Athlete of the Year
 2004 – Elected to the "Illini Men's Basketball All-Century Team"
 2008 – Honored as one of the 33 honored jerseys, which hang in the State Farm Center, to show regard for being one of the most decorated basketball players in the University of Illinois' history.
 2018 – Inducted into the Illinois Athletics Hall of Fame

NBA
 1991 – NBA Slam Dunk Contest competitor
 1991 – NBA All-Rookie First Team
 1999 – annual steals leader
 2018 – Charlotte Hornets 30th Anniversary Team

NBA career statistics

NBA

Regular season

|-
| style="text-align:left;"|
| style="text-align:left;"|Charlotte
| 82 || 36 || 23.7 || .450 || .143 || .835 || 3.2 || 3.7 || 1.3 || .5 || 11.0
|-
| style="text-align:left;"|
| style="text-align:left;"|Charlotte
| 79 || 79 || 36.8 || .467 || .240 || .745 || 5.1 || 4.2 || 1.9 || .6 || 20.5
|-
| style="text-align:left;"|
| style="text-align:left;"|Charlotte
| 69 || 67 || 35.2 || .449 || .274 || .772 || 4.9 || 3.9 || 1.4 || .5 || 16.9
|-
| style="text-align:left;"|
| style="text-align:left;"|Seattle
| 79 || 77 || 30.8 || .443 || .317 || .782 || 3.4 || 3.5 || 1.9 || .4 || 14.1
|-
| style="text-align:left;"|
| style="text-align:left;"|Seattle
| 73 || 58 || 29.1 || .457 || .368 || .742 || 4.0 || 2.6 || 1.6 || .4 || 13.7
|-
| style="text-align:left;"|
| style="text-align:left;"|Charlotte
| 36 || 36 || 35.1 || .481 || .315 || .761 || 5.3 || 6.3 || 1.2 || .6 || 12.9
|-
| style="text-align:left;"|
| style="text-align:left;"|New Jersey
| 11 || 10 || 38.0 || .441 || .360 || .831 || 3.9 || 3.2 || 2.0 || .2 || 17.5
|-
| style="text-align:left;"|
| style="text-align:left;"|New Jersey
| 82 || 81 || 39.0 || .443 || .336 || .797 || 6.1 || 4.0 || 1.9 || .6 || 21.8
|-
| style="text-align:left;"|
| style="text-align:left;"|New Jersey
| 81 || 81 || 33.7 || .429 || .257 || .688 || 4.8 || 2.5 || 1.9 || .8 || 13.4
|-
| style="text-align:left;"|
| style="text-align:left;"|New Jersey
| 50 || 47 || 32.1 || .398 || .118 || .683 || 4.9 || 2.5 || style="background:#cfecec;"|2.7* || .5 || 11.8
|-
| style="text-align:left;"|
| style="text-align:left;"|New Jersey
| 76 || 75 || 31.0 || .414 || .256 || .710 || 3.7 || 2.8 || 1.8 || .5 || 13.1
|-
| style="text-align:left;"|
| style="text-align:left;"|New Jersey
| 31 || 26 || 28.8 || .331 || .286 || .722 || 4.2 || 2.8 || 1.5 || .2 || 9.1
|-
| style="text-align:left;"|
| style="text-align:left;"|Miami
| 65 || 49 || 21.7 || .384 || .136 || .677 ||| 2.8 || 1.5 || .7 || .1 || 5.7
|-
| style="text-align:left;"|
| style="text-align:left;"|Minnesota
| 82 || 34 || 25.2 || .422 || .322 || .764 || 3.0 || 1.9 || 1.0 || .2 || 8.7
|-
| style="text-align:left;"|
| style="text-align:left;"|Chicago
| 56 || 35 || 25.2 || .392 || .237 || .735 || 3.4 || 1.6 || 1.2 || .3 || 9.6
|-
| style="text-align:left;"|
| style="text-align:left;"|Milwaukee
| 14 || 0 || 20.3 || .400 || .333 || .900 || 2.6 || 1.9 || 1.0 || .3 || 6.1
|- class="sortbottom"
| style="text-align:center;" colspan="2"|Career
| 966 || 791 || 30.5 || .434 || .300 || .754 || 4.1 || 3.0 || 1.6 || .4 || 13.4

Playoffs

|-
| style="text-align:left;"|1993
| style="text-align:left;"|Charlotte
| 9 || 9 || 39.2 || .401 || .167 || .714 || 5.1 || 2.9 || 2.3 || .7 || 17.3
|-
| style="text-align:left;"|1994
| style="text-align:left;"|Seattle
| 5 || 5 || 30.6 || .433 || .222 || .619 || 4.8 || 2.0 || 1.2 || .2 || 13.4
|-
| style="text-align:left;"|1995
| style="text-align:left;"|Seattle
| 4 || 0 || 18.0 || .360 || .250 || .625 || 1.0 || 2.5 || 1.0 || .3 || 6.3
|-
| style="text-align:left;"|1998
| style="text-align:left;"|New Jersey
| 3 || 3 || 33.3 || .450 ||  || .875 || 4.3 || 1.0 || 1.3 || .3 || 14.3
|-
| style="text-align:left;"|2003
| style="text-align:left;"|Minnesota
| 6 || 0 || 19.7 || .370 || .500 || .643 || 2.2 || 1.2 || .7 || .2 || 5.2
|- class="sortbottom"
| style="text-align:center;" colspan="2"|Career
| 27 || 17 || 29.5 || .408 || .259 || .686 || 3.7 || 2.1 || 1.4 || .4 || 11.9

College

|-
| style="text-align:left;"|1986–87
| style="text-align:left;"|Illinois
| 31 || 0 || 11.1 || .482 || .000 || .642 || 1.4 || .9 || 1.3 || .3 || 3.7
|-
| style="text-align:left;"|1987–88
| style="text-align:left;"|Illinois
| 33 || 23 || 28.7 || .471 || .304 || .753 || 2.2 || 4.2 || 2.0 || .1 || 10.4
|-
| style="text-align:left;"|1988–89
| style="text-align:left;"|Illinois
| 24 || 18 || 28.4 || .542 || .458 || .793 || 2.9 || 3.8 || 2.1 || .3 || 15.4
|-
| style="text-align:left;"|1989–90
| style="text-align:left;"|Illinois
| 29 || 29 || 34.5 || .500 || .348 || .777 || 4.9 || 3.3 || 2.2 || .6 || 20.0
|- class="sortbottom"
| style="text-align:center;" colspan="2"|Career
| 117 || 70 || 25.4 || .501 || .374 || .755 || 2.8 || 3.0 || 1.9 || .3 || 12.0

See also
 List of National Basketball Association career steals leaders
 List of National Basketball Association players with most steals in a game

References

External links

 IHSA 1986 Class AA Boys Summary
 
 Gill joins Bulls Pre-Game Live

1968 births
Living people
African-American basketball players
African-American boxers
All-American college men's basketball players
American broadcasters
American male boxers
American men's basketball players
Basketball players from Chicago
Big3 players
Boxers from Chicago
Charlotte Hornets draft picks
Charlotte Hornets players
Chicago Bulls players
Illinois Fighting Illini men's basketball players
Miami Heat players
Milwaukee Bucks players
Minnesota Timberwolves players
New Jersey Nets players
People from Flossmoor, Illinois
People from Park Forest, Illinois
Seattle SuperSonics players
Shooting guards
Small forwards
21st-century African-American people
20th-century African-American sportspeople
American men's 3x3 basketball players